Hubert Reed or Reid may refer to:

Hub Reed, basketball player
Hubert Reed, character in The Negotiator (novel)
Hubert Reid, see 1906–07 South Africa rugby union tour

See also
Bert Reed, American football player